Renegade Derby Dames (RDD) is a women's flat track roller derby league based in Alliston, Ontario. Founded in 2011, the league consists of two teams, which compete against teams from other leagues. Renegade is a member of the Women's Flat Track Derby Association (WFTDA).

History
The league was founded in April 2011 by a group of existing skaters from other teams in the region. It played its first bout in November, taking on Durham Region Roller Derby.

In January 2013, Renegade was accepted as a member of the Women's Flat Track Derby Association Apprentice Program.  The league played a more intensive schedule during 2013, bouting three weeks in a row during July. On March 11, 2014, Renegade was made a full member of the WFTDA.

WFTDA rankings

References

Roller derby leagues established in 2011
Roller derby leagues in Canada
Women's Flat Track Derby Association Division 3
2011 establishments in Ontario